Donny Fernando Siregar or Donny Siregar is an Indonesian footballer who currently plays for PSMS Medan as a midfielder.

Club career 
He previously played for Persijap Jepara and Persiba Balikpapan. In December 2014, he signed with Gresik United. In 2016, he signed with his hometown team PSMS Medan.

References

External links 
 Profile at goal.com

Indonesian footballers
1983 births
Living people
People from Toba Samosir Regency
Persijap Jepara players
Persiba Balikpapan players
Pro Duta FC players
Gresik United players
Indonesian Premier Division players
Liga 1 (Indonesia) players
Association football forwards
Sportspeople from North Sumatra
21st-century Indonesian people